is a Japanese animated epic science fiction film. It was premiered in Hong Kong, Indonesia, Macau, Malaysia, Singapore, South Korea and Taiwan on 25 March 2020 Pandemic Covid-19 / Coronavirus In Indonesia Japan on 1 March 2019 and in India on 22 January 2023. It is directed by Shinnosuke Yakuwa and screenplay by Mizuki Tsujimura.
This is the very final and last Heisei-era Doraemon movie released twenty-four day and two months before the 2019 Japanese imperial transition.

Plot 
One morning, Nobita learns about the mysterious happenings on the Moon, where he tells his classmates that it was the Moon Rabbit, but nobody believes him. He tries to prove by imitating the rabbits by making ricecakes and hits his teacher in the process, where he gets punished. When Nobita tells Doraemon about this, who relucantly takes out "Divergent View Badge" gadget and creates an atmosphere on the moon. Using the animal clay, they creates Moonbit and returns to their home. Later, Nobita's mother tells him to bring Susuki grass for Moon Viewing Ceremony, where he sees a boy and calls him, but the boy suddenly disappeares. The next day, a new student named Luca arrives, and Nobita gets surprised to see that it is the same boy he had saw yesterday. 

As soon as Nobita reaches home, he asks Doraemon to take him to the Kingdom. Upon reaching there, they find that the bamboo plants were glowing which was the effect of the "Shining Moss", spread by them earlier. Nobita is in the playground with Shizuka, Gian, and Suneo, where he gives them the badge and invites them to the Kingdom. Luca joins them and they are given a grand welcome at the rabbit kingdom, and they meet a rabbit that looked like Nobita and named it as Nobit, and teases Nobita. Shizuka requests Nobit to give them a good tour of the place. Doraemon reveals that they can see this kingdom because of the badge they are wearing and warns them not to remove it as it is only due to the badge, they are able to breathe. Within a few seconds, a huge rabbit monster (made by Nobita while making Moonbit) arrives and wreaks havoc. 

Nobita chases him and later falls into a deep abyss without the badge. Soon the group arrives, and Nobit, who had seen everything tells them that Nobita had fallen. Doraemon gets worried about Nobita, but hears Nobita's voice from below rang out, and the group discovered that Nobita is safe and soon learned that Luca is not an Earthling, but an Espal from the planet Kaguya who has special powers, known as Ether. Luca introduced his friends to his sister Luna, but suddenly they hear a loud noise and heads towards the place and discoveres that it is his little brother Al's song. Luca tells everyone that his power is quite different from the other Espal and also that Al can see the future. The group decides to hold a Space Kart Race on Moon's surface. Gian, Suneo, and Al are in the lead. When their cart is about to crash with a huge rock, Al uses its power to destroy the rock.

The others arrive there and Luca reveals that they are trying to hide from the people of Kaguya planet and that Diabolo had previously used the Ether power to destroy the Moon of the Kaguya planet to show-off his power, but the particles of the Moon covered the whole Kaguya Planet and it had become a dark planet due to which, his parents used a ship to send all the Espal to space to avoid being taken advantage of doing disastrous things again. Suddenly, an unknown raid force arrive out of nowhere and tries to capture Espal, where the other Espal also came out from their hiding to the surface to enquire about the explosion. The Kaguya beings uses "Ether Distortion" to weaken the Espal. The Kaguya beings had captured all Espal, except Luca while Doraemon tells everyone to run towards the "Anywhere Door" to escape, but Luca gets  kidnapped. 

The anywhere door explodes due to the attack of the Kaguya beings. Nobita tells Doraemon to use "Bamboo Copter" to fly to Moon, but Doraemon denies this. Mozo, the Kaguya turtle comes out of Shizuka's shirt and tells them to use the emergency ship which he and Luca had used to come to Earth. Doraemon tells everyone to gather here at 7 pm. At 7pm, the group flies towards the moon. Upon reaching there, they find Moonbit, who was trying to say something, they decide to follow him and finds Luna, who reveals that Luca had given his badge to her due to which, she managed to escape. Nobita, Doraemon, Suneo, Mozo, and Gian decide to leave for Kaguya and Doraemon gives Shizuka his spare pocket and the "Danger Alarm". 

Meanwhile, Commander Godat takes Luca to Diabolo, who reveals his plans to leave Kaguya and attack Earth. Later, Godat frees Luca from the handcuffs, and is filled with rage to know that he was being used. The royal servants reach there and arrests Godat and Luca. Upon arriving there, the friends decides to ask the residents of the planet about the Espal. The residents reveals that they do not know anything about them, but all the important people on the planet lives in the Royal Palace. The gang enters the palace and starts searching for Luca and his friends. In the prison, Godat reveals to Luca that he was the descendant of Dr. Godal (the person who created Espal) and gives him a blue orb which he inherited from his ancestors, and Luca kept in his pocket. The gang arrives there and frees the Espal. Luca tells them that Godat is their ally. 

Gian and Suneo decide to handle the royal soldiers while Godat, Luca, Nobita, and Doraemon advance to fight Diabolo, whose true form is revealed to be a robot. Diabolo attacks the four and became unconscious while Gian and Suneo's guns had finished and are also captured. On the Moon, Shizuka sees Nobit working on something and she starts thinking that as soon as she removes the badge, Nobit and all of the Rabbit Kingdom vanishes. She removes it and is shocked to still be able to see Nobit. It is because of the Reality Badge made by Nobit. Nobita and the team wake up and find themselves in a cage. Diabolo tells them that he is going to use the Ether to become young again. Soon after, he becomes a bit young. Nobita provokes him to take out a gadget but Doraemon says that his pocket is not there. 

Diabolo had taken his pocket away when he was unconscious. Suddenly, Shizuka and Luna along with the Moonbit come out of Doraemon's pocket and they free the Espal, where they tell them that it was due to Nobit's badge. The whole tables have turned against Diabolo and is about to be destroyed, but manages to capture Luna and escape. He says that he is going to Earth and will destroy it. Mozo tells that his shell is the hardest in the universe and they put it in the Air Cannon. Luca gives a Power Boost to Nobita, and Mozo goes straight through the ship, destroying it completely. Suneo catches Luna and saves her from falling. Suddenly, the blue orb starts shining and the light of the planet is restored. Doraemon investigates the orb and tells them that it is a kind of Shining Moss that was built to multiply and explode, when in contact with Ether. 

Nobita tells that Luca's ancestors knew that he would come back and restore the light of the planet. Godat requests Luca to stay with him, but refuses to say that for a peaceful life, it would be better than Espal remains a myth. Back on Moon, Luca requests Doraemon to create a theory that Espal are just normal beings and the rabbit ears vanish off, where they become normal beings. Doraemon and their friends arrive back to earth, where they bury their badges, to ensure a peaceful life for the Espal.

Soundtrack
The theme song is “THE GIFT” by Dai Hirai.

A separate soundtrack was released on February 27, 2019, with music composed by Takayuki Hattori.

Cast

Box office 
Debuting on 383 screens with Toho distributing, Doraemon the Movie: Nobita's Chronicle of the Moon Exploration earned $6.2million on 586,000 admissions in its first weekend and ranked number-one on Japanese box office.

The film was released in Hong Kong, Indonesia, Macau, Malaysia, Singapore, South Korea and Taiwan on 5 February 2019 marking Chinese New Year and in Japan on 1 March 2019.

Here is a table which shows the box office of this movie of all the weekends in Japan:

References

External links

Official movie: Nobita's Chronicle of the Moon Exploration

Nobita's Chronicle of the Moon Exploration
2019 films
2019 anime films
2019 animated films
2010s children's animated films
2010s dystopian films
Moon in film
Japanese animated science fiction films
2010s science fiction films
Japanese science fiction films
Animated films about cats
Animated films about rabbits and hares
Robot films
2010s adventure films
Films scored by Takayuki Hattori